The Ukrainian Naval Infantry Corps, also known as the Ukrainian Marines, is part of coastal defense troops of the Ukrainian Navy. It is used as a component part of amphibious, airborne and amphibious-airborne operations, alone or in coordination with formations and units of the Army in order to capture parts of the seashore, islands, ports, fleet bases, coast airfields and other coast objects from the enemy. It can also be used to defend naval bases, vital shoreline areas, separate islands and coast objects, and security of hostile areas.

Mission
The Naval Infantry's missions are to:
 Act independently during attacks on enemy's naval installations, ports, islands and coastal areas
 Clear the enemy's coastal areas & provide security during the landing of the main forces.

Its motto is Вірний завжди! ("Always Faithful!") .

History
The Marine Corps is descended from the formations of the Black Sea Fleet Naval Infantry of the former Imperial Russian Navy.

Hetmanate
Former Russian Imperial army general Pavlo Skoropadskyi understood the importance of naval infantry in providing security to the country. Being the commander-in-chief of land and naval forces, Skoropadskyi brought attention to creating the naval infantry during his first month in power. On May 23, 1918, he ordered the Department of Navy to Begin forming a Brigade of naval infantry consisting of three regiments.

The mission of the Naval Infantry was protecting coastal areas, serving as a garrison force for forts and conducting landing operations. According to the order the Brigade was divided into three regiments. First regiment was responsible for the areas between the western border until the village of Suchavka, near Odesa. Second regiment was responsible for territory between Suchavka and Stanislavov. Third regiment protected the areas from Stanislavov until Perekop. Brigade was also put in charge of guarding the property of the Navy Department.

Each of the three regiments consisted of three kurins. Each kurin consisted of three Sotnia and a machine gun unit. Commandant of the first regiment was Ilarion Isaievych.

On August 31, 1918, each unit was given the permanent headquarters. First regiment's HQ was located in Odesa, second's HQ in Mykolaiv and third's HQ in Kherson. Also at this time 3 squadrons of cavalry were formed. First was stationed in Odesa, second in Ochakiv and third in Perekop.

In October 1918 new recruits born in 1899, would have joined the ranks of the naval infantry, however due to the political situation of that autumn the recruits had to wait until a better time.

Not long after, Pavlo Skoropadskyi was removed from power in an uprising led by Symon Petliura. The Naval Infantry continued to faithfully serve their nation under the banner of the Ukrainian People's Republic. Many of them have died for freedom and independence.

Modern history

On February 22, 1993, the 880th Separate Naval Infantry Battalion of the Black Sea Fleet commanded by Major Vitaliy Rozhmanov pledged their allegiance to Ukraine.

After the Navy was created on July 1, 1993, as a separate service branch of the Armed Forces, the first battalion of the Naval Infantry was formed in the city of Sevastopol. The first naval infantrymen were transferred from the airmobile units. On September 1, 1993, the 41st Separate Naval Infantry Battalion was formed. By September 20, 1994, the 4th Naval Infantry Brigade was stationed in the Tylove village of Crimea.

From May 1996 until 1998, the Brigade was a part of the Ukrainian National Guard. In 1998, it was transferred to the Navy and re-designated the 1st Separate Naval Infantry Brigade. In 1999, the Brigade consisted of two battalions numbering 1,500 marines.
During 2003–04, the Ukrainian armed forces underwent a program to reduce the number of brigades, and the Naval Infantry Brigade was reduced to a Battalion.

The command of the Naval Forces of the Armed Forces of Ukraine made a decision to form a new Naval Infantry battalion by force of a mechanised battalion located in Kerch. In December 2013 the militaries of the new 501st Separate Naval Infantry Battalion have taken the Naval Infantry Oath.

After the Russian annexation of the Crimea the battalions were deployed to another location out of the peninsula. After the annexation of Crimea Ukraine's marine forces composed of only about 200 active duty personnel.

Special reconnaissance units of the Marine Corps were deployed against insurgents during the 2014 war in Donbas. Oleksandr Zinchenko of the 73rd Spetsnaz Detachment was the first Ukrainian Marine killed during the war in Donbas. The Ukrainian Marine Corps was particularly hard hit by the Crimea Crisis as all of their forces except for the 73rd Spetsnaz Detachment were stationed on the peninsula, due to this the unit had to undergo extensive reorganization before being able to be deployed to the war in the Donbas.

In September 2014 the Ministry of Defense announced that the Marine Corps were reforming from the Crimea Crisis and the remaining members of the 1st Marine Battalion which was stationed in Feodosya would take an active part in the war in Donbas. On 29 October 2014 Ukraine's Marine Corps conventional forces, recently recovered from the Crimea Crisis suffered their first casualty near Mariupol, the Marine was a Major and was killed when his unit's position came under Russian artillery fire.

On 8 November 2014 Ukrainian marines returned to their permanent place of deployment in Mykolaiv as part of a regular rotation of Ukrainian forces during the war in Donbas.

On 23 May 2018, the NI celebrated the first Marine Corps Birthday celebrations, the holiday being officially sanctioned by President Petro Poroshenko as part of a nationalization of the former Soviet holidays, replacing those with the ones celebrating Ukrainian military history. The holiday marked the formation of the first marine units in May 1918, during the Ukrainian War of Independence. New colours were awarded incorporating the speciality badge awarded to the unit in 2007. The NI was transformed into the Fleet Marine Division with 2 brigades and an independent brigade of marine artillery. The former black berets were changed to light green following the practice of the British Royal Marines and the Italian Army Lagunari.

Expansion 
The new colours include the blue cross from the naval ensign as an acknowledgement of its role as a constituent service of the Navy. Plans are underway for the formation of a 3rd Marine brigade, bringing the total number of brigades to four plus one MRL regiment, with an option for a fourth brigade.

If the expansion continues it can be possible that the Naval Infantry Corps will be elevated to a full Corps-sized formation within the Navy, becoming the largest ever marine unit in Eastern Europe outside of Russia and with possible accession to NATO, the largest marine component within its European member armed forces.

However Ukraine joining NATO is extremely unlikely. Due to the comments of President Zelenskiy.

Reform 
The ideal goal in the reform of the Naval Infantry Corps is to form a unit which would be similar to the units sent to Iraq. It is planned that there will be no more conscripts in the Naval Infantry, only professional naval infantrymen under contract service.

2022 Russian invasion of Ukraine 
With the 2022 Russian invasion of Ukraine, the Naval Infantry fought against Russian forces invading the country. They are active at the southern regions of Ukraine, having participated at the Southern Ukraine and Eastern Ukraine campaigns.

Siege of Mariupol 

On 12 April 2022, videos have emerged of fighters apparently from the 501st Battalion of the 36th Separate Marine Brigade vowing not to surrender their positions, saying "We are holding on to every bit of the city wherever possible," and "But the reality is the city is encircled and blocked and there was no re-supply of ammunition or food,". The next day, Russian Defence Ministry as well as the Chechen leader Ramzan Kadyrov announced 1,026 Ukrainian Marines, including 162 officers, of the 36th Separate Marine Brigade laid down their weapons and surrendered in Mariupol. Ukrainian Defence Ministry spokesperson Oleksandr Motuzyanyk said he had no information about the claim, and there was no immediate comment from the Ukrainian President's office nor the Ukrainian general staff. A top advisor to Ukraine's President Volodymyr Zelensky has said another Marine unit that was encircled in the middle of Mariupol had broken through to connect with the Azov Regiment and that Mariupol is still standing. By 16 April, the Marines and Azov had entrenched themselves in the Azovstal iron and steel works, the last Ukrainian bastion in Mariupol. By May 17, most Azovstal defenders surrendered.

In June, a kangaroo court of the self-proclaimed Donetsk People's Republic (DPR) condemned three members of the Ukrainian Marines in Mariupol to death: Aiden Aslin, Shaun Pinner and Brahim Saadoun. The three of them were foreign volunteers and were accused by the Russians of mercenarism, which has been disputed as the three of them were sworn members of the Ukrainian Navy, making them active-duty soldiers who should be protected by the Geneva conventions on prisoners of war. They were released in September as part of a prisoner swap.

Organization

1918 structure
1st Regiment - Odessa
1st Kurin
1st Sotnia
2nd Sotnia
3rd Sotnia
Machine Gun Unit
2nd Kurin
3rd Kurin
2nd Regiment - Mykolaiv
3rd Regiment - Kherson
1st Cavalry Squadron - Odesa
2nd Cavalry Squadron - Ochakiv
3rd Cavalry Squadron - Perekop

1998 structure
Corps HQ
1st Air Assault Battalion "Lion"
2nd Air Assault Battalion "Berkut"
1st Air Assault Reconnaissance Battalion "Sword"
Separate Combat Engineer Battalion "Crab"
Separate Signal Company
1st Anti-Tank Battalion
1st Anti-Aircraft Artillery Battalion
1st Marine Artillery Battalion
2nd Marine Artillery Battalion

Fleet Marine Division

As of 2018 the Fleet Naval Infantry Division's structure is as follows:

Fleet Marine Infantry Division of the Ukrainian Navy, Mykolaiv
 Division HQ
 Division HQ Services Battalion
 36th Separate Marine Brigade, Mykolaiv
 Headquarters & Services Company
 1st Naval Infantry Battalion, Mykolaiv (BTR-80)
 501st Naval Infantry Battalion, Mariupol (BTR-80)
 503rd Naval Infantry Battalion, Berdiansk (BTR-80)
 505th Naval Infantry Battalion (under formation)
 4th Naval Infantry Battalion (Air Assault) (under formation)
 1st Naval infantry Tank Battalion (T-80)
 1st Naval Infantry Brigade Artillery Group 
 Regimental HQ and Target Acquisition Battery
 1st Naval Infantry Self-propelled Field Artillery Battalion (2S1 Gvozdika)
 1st Naval Infantry Rocket Launcher Artillery Battalion (BM-21 Grad)
 1st Naval Infantry Anti-tank Artillery Battalion (MT-12 Rapira)
 Marine Artillery Reconnaissance Battalion
 Security Company
 Engineer Company
 Replacement and Maintenance Battery
 Logistics Company
 Signals Platoon
 CBRN-defense Platoon
 1st Marine Anti-Air Defense Missile Artillery Battalion
 1st Marine Combat Engineer Battalion
 1st Marine Maintenance Battalion
 1st Marine Logistics Battalion
 Force Reconnaissance Company
 Sniper Company
 Electronic Warfare Company
 Signals Company
 Anti-Aircraft Radar Company
 CBRN-defense Company
 Medical Company
 Military Police Company 
 Naval Infantry Brigade Band
 35th Marine Brigade, Dachne
 Headquarters & Services Company
 136th Naval Infantry Battalion (under formation)
 137th Naval Infantry Battalion
 18th Naval Infantry Battalion (under formation)
 88th Marine Battalion (Air Assault) (under formation)
 2nd Naval Infantry Brigade Artillery Group
 Regimental HQ and Target Acquisition Battery
 Naval Infantry Self-propelled Field Artillery Battalion (2S1 Gvozdika)
 Naval Infantry Rocket Launcher Artillery Battalion (BM-21 Grad)
 Naval Infantry Anti-tank Artillery Battalion (MT-12 Rapira)
 Naval Infantry Artillery Reconnaissance Battalion
 Security Company
 Engineer Company
 Replacement and Maintenance Battery
 Logistics Company
 Signals Platoon
 CBRN-defense Platoon
 2nd Naval Infantry Tank Battalion (under formation)
 2nd Naval Infantry Anti-Air Defense Missile Artillery Battalion
 2nd Naval Infantry Engineer Battalion
 2nd Naval Infantry Maintenance Battalion
 2nd Naval Infantry Logistics Battalion
 Force Reconnaissance Company
 Sniper Company
 Electronic Warfare Company
 Signals Company
 Anti-Aircraft Radar Company
 CBRN-defense Company
 Medical Company
 Military Police Company 
 35th Naval Infantry Brigade Band
 37th Marine Brigade (under formation stage)
 Headquarters & Services Company
 38th Marine Brigade (under formation stage)
 Headquarters & Services Company
 32nd Marine MRL Artillery Regiment, Altestove
 Headquarters & Headquarters Battery
 1st Rocket Artillery Battalion (BM-27 Uragan)
 2nd Rocket Artillery Battalion (BM-21 Grad)
 3rd Rocket Artillery Battalion (BM-21 Grad)
 Security Company
 Engineer Company
 MRL Replacement and Maintenance Company
 Logistic Company
 Signal Platoon
 CBRN-defense Platoon
 Regimental Band
 406th Marine Field and Coastal Defense Artillery Brigade (Amphibious)
 Headquarters & Target Acquisition Battery
 64th Field Artillery Battalion (MU А4217), Bilhorod-Dnistrovskyi, Odessa Oblast
 65th Field Artillery Battalion (MU А3687), Dachne-2 village, Odessa Oblast
 66th Field Artillery Battalion (MU А2611), Berdyansk, Zaporizhzhia Oblast
 67th Field Artillery Battalion (MU А1804), Ochakiv, Mykolaiv Oblast
 1st Naval Infantry Anti-tank Artillery Battalion (MT-12 Rapira)
 Naval Infantry Artillery Reconnaissance Battalion
 Security Company
 Engineers Company
 Maintenance and Replacement Battery
 Logistics Company
 Signals Platoon
 CBRN-defense Platoon
 Naval Infantry Brigade Band
 37th Marine Signals Regiment, Radisne, Odessa Oblast
 140th Marine Reconnaissance Battalion (Separate) (new raising as of 2019)
 7th Naval Infantry Divisional Anti-Air Defense Missile Artillery Battalion, Ochakiv, Mykolaiv Oblast (to be expanded to regiment)
 Divisional Marine Engineer Battalion (to be expanded to Regiment size)
 Naval Infantry Maintenance Battalion
 Naval Infantry Division Logistics Battalion
 Sniper Company
 Electronic Warfare Company
 HQ Signals Company
 Anti-Aircraft Radar Company
 Divisional CBRN-defense Company
 Divisional Medical Company (to be expanded to battalion)
 Divisional Military Police Company (to be expanded into battalion)
 Marine Division Band Mykolaiv

It was announced June 10, 2019 that the 56th Motorized Brigade may be transferred to the Ukrainian Naval Infantry. It is not known if the 56th Brigade would be redesignated as either the 37th or 40th Naval Infantry Brigades or if it will retain its current designation as 56th Brigade.

The Naval Infantry infantry battalions are organized as follows:

 Marine Battalion Headquarters & Headquarters Company/Platoon
 1st Company (Air Assault)
 2nd Company
 3rd Company
 Mortar Battery
 Logistic Company
 Reconnaissance Platoon
 Anti-Aircraft Missile Artillery Platoon
 Anti-tank Artillery Platoon
 Engineer Platoon
 Landing Equipment/Assault Amphibian Platoon
 Signal Platoon
 Medical Platoon

The tank and artillery battalions are organized similarly but with one to 4 tank companies or artillery batteries.

Weapons and vehicular equipment 
The NIC-UKRN is equipped with the following vehicles:

 T-64, T-72, T-80, PT-91 Twardy main battle tanks in Marine Tank Battalions
 BMP-1, BMP-2, BMP-3 tracked infantry fighting vehicles in tracked Marine Battalions and Marine Assault Amphibian Battalions
 BTR-3, BTR-4 wheeled infantry fighting vehicles in wheeled Marine Battalions and Marine Assault Amphibian Battalions
 BTR-60, BTR-70, BTR-80, BTR-7, VAB, Patria Pasi wheeled armored personnel carriers in wheeled Marine Battalions and Marine Assault Amphibian Battalions
 MT-LB and PTS series (PTS-2 and PTS-3) tracked armored personnel carriers in tracked Marine Battalions and Marine Assault Amphibian Battalions
 BRDM-2 armored scout cars, some on tank destroyer configuration, in Marine Battalions
 Bushmaster, Cougar, Mastiff, International MaxxPro, BMC Kirpi MRAPs in wheeled Marine Battalions, Marine Assault Amphibian Battalions and Marine Reconnaissance
 Humvees, GAZ Tiger, Roshel Senators, Varta, ATF Dingo and Novator armored cars and mobility vehicles in wheeled Marine Battalions, Marine Assault Amphibian Battalions and Marine Reconnaissance

It is also equipped with the following field artillery systems in the Marine Artillery Battalions:

 Maritime Brimstone tactical ballistic missiles
 RK-360MC Nepture, Harpoon (MOBA) and RBS-17 Hellfire anti-ship missiles
 BM-21 Grad, BM-21 Verba, BM-27 Uragan, BM-27 Burevyi, M142 HIMARS, RM-70, S-8 multiple launch rocket systems
 2S1 Gvozdika, 2S3 Akatsiya, 152mm SpGH DANA self-propelled artillery howitzers
 D-30, D-20, 2A65 Msta-B, 2A36 Giatsint-B, M114, M777, FH70, L119 towed howitzers
 9K114 Shturm, 9M113 Konkurs, 2A29/MT-12 Rapira anti-tank guns
 82 mm and 120 mm mortars

The 7th Marine Anti-Air Defense Missile Artillery Battalion and the two brigade air defense battalions are equipped with:

 9K33 Osa, AN/TWQ-1 Avenger wheeled mobile anti-air defense short range surface-to-air missile launchers
 KS-30, AZP S-60, ZU-23-2, ZPU series towed or truck mounted short range anti-aircraft guns

See also
Marines

References

Ukrainian Navy
Military units and formations of Ukraine
Marines
Military units and formations established in 1918